Campo de Rugby Valle de las Cañas, known also as Valle de las Cañas is a rugby stadium located in the town of Pozuelo de Alarcón, Spain. It is a natural grass field opened in 2000 and holds about 500 people.

The facilities are used by CRC Madrid plays for playing rugby in División de Honor, as well by Olímpico RC. The field was also the home stadium of Gatos de Madrid during the Liga Superibérica first edition in 2009.

The sports complex
Valle de las Cañas', is a sports complex inaugurated in 2010 by the Pozuelo de Alarcón city hall. Currently, the facilities are owned by the private capital company Grand Slam 5 S.L. of which the former tennis player José López-Maeso is part. During its inaugural year, it hosted the sports trainings of Real Madrid Baloncesto. As of currently, the multi-purpose building is dedicated to offer sports services to the Community of Madrid.

Location
Located in the II district of Pozuelo de Alarcón, the Valle de las Cañas sports complex is situated between the Europe's biggest multi-purpose facilities with more than 200.000 square meters of extension and 17.000 square meters dedicated to the main building, where the Fitness Sports Valle de las Cañas sports pavilion.

See also
CRC Madrid
División de Honor de Rugby
Liga Superibérica

References

External links
 CRC Madrid official page
 Federación Madrileña de Rugby
 Federación Española de Rugby
 Fitness Sports official website

Rugby union stadiums in Spain
Sports venues in the Community of Madrid
Sports venues completed in 2000
Sport in Pozuelo de Alarcón
Buildings and structures in Pozuelo de Alarcón